Behavioural ethics is a new field of social scientific research that seeks to understand how people actually behave when confronted with ethical dilemmas. It refers to behaviour that is judged according to generally accepted norms of behaviour.

Behavioural ethics lead to the development of ethical models such as the so-called "bystander intervention", which describes ethical behavior as far harder to display because of what we learn from social institutions such as family, school, and religion. Here, intervening in an ethically challenging situation means that an individual must go through several steps and that failure to complete all means a failure to behave ethically.

Behavioural ethics in different fields

Behavioural ethics and education 
In ethics teaching and research, ethics is arguably the "next big thing" because its investigation agenda has generated many knowledge on why and how people choose and act when being confronted with ethical subject, which was unknown previously. Based on the extant body of ethics course books and course plans from fields such as medicine, teaching, accounting, and journalism, "moral reasoning" - along with associated skills - is often an established objective. Behavioural ethics, however, is distinguished from the concept of moral reasoning because ethical behaviour is primarily driven by a diverse set of intuitive processes over which individuals have little conscious control. Behavioural ethics calls for a model of ethics in education that focuses not on directly modelling good ethical reasoning but on the way people think clearly and impartially about ethical problems.

Behavioural Ethics and Rational Actor Model 
Philosophical views about morality has been supported traditionally by theoretical reasoning and introspection, with at best passing reference to actual human behaviour. Models of human morality advanced by behavioural ethics based on the fact that morality is a new and still developing quality of the evolutionary dynamic that leads to our species.

Behavioural Ethics Meets Behavioural Law and Economics 
Clarifying the difference between behavioural law and economics(BLE) and behavioural ethics(BE) is of importance. Compared to BLE, BE has reduced its ability of influencing broad legal academic circles. In addition, unlike BLE, BE was advanced as piece of the management literature, which is less related to legal scholarship than BLE is, and thus less likely to have impact on it.

Behavioural Ethics and Justice 
Behavioural ethics researchers have found the relationship between employees' justice perceptions and also, ethical and unethical behaviour. In the 1990s, organizational justice became one of the most studied organizational themes. The term organizational justice is created by Greenberg(1987) to involve employee's perception of organizational events, policies, and practices as being fair or not fair. Classic work on distributive justice, procedural justice and interactional justice has been built. This research has focused on theoretical advance and empirical testing about the formation of justice judgements as well as the result of these justice evaluation. Justice and injustice perception have been related to an extensive variety of employee attitudes and behaviours consisted of trust, satisfaction, turnover and plenty of opposite formal negative behaviours such as theft and unethical behaviours which are more common.

Research
There are experiments that can be linked to behavioural ethics. The Trolley problem and the Prisoner's dilemma both place individuals in decision-making situations that carry ethical questions. In each, an individual is asked to make a decision that affects another person. In the prisoner's dilemma, the principles of Reciprocity (social psychology) and Cooperation come into play, but not all who participate behave in the same manner. In the Trolley problem an individual has to choose which group of people to save. Both of these experiments shed light on how people behave when confronted with ethical dilemmas.

The impact of behavioural ethics 
If firms are able to utilize the principles of behavioural psychology to alter consumer's behaviour and thus increase sales and governments can change people's behaviour and hence promote policy target using those same principles, then individuals and their employers can apply related principles of behavioural ethics to promote ethical behaviour in the company and in society.

Example of Unethical behaviour in Business 
According to an article in the Chron.com, examples of unethical behaviour in business an environment can include:

 Deliberate Deception
 Violation of Conscience
 Failure to Honour Commitments
 Unlawful Conduct
 Disregard of Company Policy

These behaviours are mostly based on different rights that we all have in society and therefore have in work environments as well. Usually each company have its own set of policy but there are some common ones as well.

Examples of Ethical Behaviour in Business Meetings 
At most business conference, employees are required to report on the progress of their missions. It can lead to an ethical dilemma because they may report their performance better than it is due to external pressure.

Unethical behaviour 
Unethical behaviour is an action that falls outside of what is thought morally appropriate for a person, a job or a company. Individuals can act unethically, as can businesses, professionals and politicians.

Research results have further shown "that people low in moral character are likely to eventually dominate cheating-enabling environments, where they then cheat extensively".

Unethical behaviour in business 
Ethics can be defined as going beyond what is legal and doing right things, even no one is paying attention to. So unethical behaviour in business is about actions that don't obey the acceptable criterion of business operations, failing to do right things in each condition.

References

Ethics
Human behavior